Western Zonal Council is a zonal council comprising the states of Goa, Gujarat, Maharashtra and the Union Territory of Dadra and Nagar Haveli and Daman and Diu.

The States have been grouped into six zones having an Advisory Council to foster cooperation among these States. Five Zonal Councils were set up vide Part-III of the States Reorganisation Act, 1956.

See also 
 Northern Zonal Council
 North-Eastern Zonal Council
 Central Zonal Council
 Eastern Zonal Council
 Southern Zonal Council

References

Zonal Councils